Abdul Jeleel Yussuf (born October 14, 1995) is an American rapper, singer, and record producer from Pawtucket, Rhode Island. He is known for his single Dive In! which received traction on social media.

Early life and education 
Jeleel was raised in Pawtucket, Rhode Island. He attended Tolman Highschool in Rhode Island for high school and graduated from Loyola University in Nigeria.

Career

2018-2020: Beginnings
Jeleel released his first song, Play Me, while attending university, though it has since been deleted from all platforms. Jeleel released the project Angel From Heaven in 2019. In 2020, he released the extended play Generation Z. In 2021, Jeleel released the song "Dive In!", which garnered over 50 million streams on Spotify, and resulted in him signing a partnership with the record label 10K Projects.

2021-present
In April 2022, Yussuf released a single titled "Rain On You!". In June 2022, he released a collaboration with rapper Mike Dimes titled Clubhouse!. In July 2022, he released a single titled "Uncivilized! (Go!)". In August 2022, he released a single titled "Stone Cold!".  In September 2022, he performed at the Made in America Festival. Also in September 2022, he released a single titled "Deliver!". In January 2023, Yussuf released a single titled “Ride the wave!” and shot the music video in Nigeria.

Musical style 
XXL's Kemet High described Jeleel's sound as "rap, punk and R&B". Alexander Cole of HotNewHipHop describes Jeleel's style as "an energetic vocal delivery, some loud rock-inspired production, and a catchy hook that will be in your head all day".

Discography

Studio albums

Mixtapes

Extended plays 

Singles

References

External links 
 

Living people
21st-century American rappers
1995 births
Alternative R&B musicians
African-American male rappers
People from Rhode Island